The National Unity Party of Canada (NUPC) was a Canadian far-right political party which based its ideology on Adolf Hitler's Nazism and Benito Mussolini's fascism. The party's activities were originally limited to Quebec, but it later expanded to Ontario and Western Canada. Party membership swelled in the mid-to-late 1930s as the party absorbed smaller fascist groups across the country. Following the outbreak of World War II, the Canadian government banned the NUPC on May 30, 1940, under the Defence of Canada Regulations of the War Measures Act. Arcand and many of his followers were consequently arrested and interned for the duration of the war.

The ban on the NUPC was lifted following the war's end in 1945, and the party resumed its activities shortly afterwards. However, its public presence greatly diminished after the war and all but disappeared following Arcand's death in 1967. The 1949 federal election was the only election ever contested by the NUPC; Arcand ran in the Quebec riding of Richelieu—Verchères and placed second, receiving a little over 29 per cent of the vote.

History 

It was known as the "Christian National Socialist Party" in English. A fascist and antisemite, Arcand described Jews in Canada as "cockroaches and insects", decried liberal democracy as a "Jewish invention" and lauded Hitler as the "saviour of Christianity". Arcand looked toward Nazi Germany and Fascist Italy for ideological inspiration. His supporters referred to him as the "Canadian Führer", a reference to the title held by Hitler.

The Canadian Nationalist Party, a fascist group based in the Prairie provinces, merged into the PNSC in October 1934. In the mid-1930s, the party claimed to have a few thousand members, mainly concentrated in Quebec, British Columbia and Alberta. The PNSC later expanded into Ontario and changed its English name to the "National Christian Party of Canada".

In mid-July 1938, several fascist groups from across Canada attended a conference hosted by the PNSC in Kingston, Ontario. The attendees agreed to unite under a single organization and consequently established the National Unity Party of Canada (NUPC). Arcand announced that "a flaming torch [would] be the new party's emblem, 'Canada for Canadians' its slogan, the upraised arm its salute and 'King, Country and Christianity' its program." At a time of mounting English-French Canadian tension, Arcand hoped to unite the two groups and create a white nationalist movement under the leadership of the NUPC. Following the conference in Kingston, Arcand left for Toronto and held a rally at Massey Hall attended by about 800 of his supporters. He was accompanied by 85 "Blueshirts", armed members of the NUPC's paramilitary force. The anti-fascist Canadian League for Peace and Democracy simultaneously held a counter-rally of 10,000 people at Maple Leaf Gardens in opposition to the NUPC.

Following the outbreak of World War II, the Canadian government banned the NUPC on May 30, 1940, under the Defence of Canada Regulations of the War Measures Act. Arcand and many of his followers were consequently arrested and interned for the duration of the war. The party resumed its activities after its ban was lifted following the end of the war in 1945.

Arcand contested the 1949 federal election in the Quebec riding of Richelieu—Verchères as a candidate for the NUPC. He placed second, receiving 5,590 votes (29.1 per cent of the total). He came in second again with 39 per cent of the vote when he ran as a "Nationalist" in Berthier—Maskinongé—Delanaudière in the 1953 federal election.

The NUPC's last known event was a banquet held in honour of Arcand on November 14, 1965, inside Montreal's Paul Sauvé Arena. About 800 to 850 attendees toasted the sickly Arcand, who had prepared a final speech praising his "loyal student" Gérard Lanctôt. By December 1966, Arcand had become bedridden by insomnia and edema; his condition worsened in April 1967 and he suffered from severe pain in his larynx. Arcand died shortly afterwards on August 1, 1967. His funeral was held at a church in Lanoraie and attended by hundreds of his supporters, many of whom gave Arcand a final Roman salute. Lanctôt subsequently inherited Arcand's position as leader of the NUPC, a position which he held until his death in 2003.

The NUPC was registered as a private enterprise with the Government of Quebec from March 13, 1978, to July 27, 2016.

Election results

See also 

 Fascism in Canada

Notes

References

Citations

Sources

Books

Journal articles

News and magazine articles

Reports

Websites

External links 
 
 National Unity Party of Canada fonds at Library and Archives Canada

1934 establishments in Canada
Banned far-right parties
Canadian far-right political movements
Christian political parties
Federal political parties in Canada
Nationalist parties in Canada
Nazi parties
Political parties established in 1934
Neo-Nazism in Canada